Aphonopelma moderatum is a species of spider in the family Theraphosidae, found in United States, in the state of Texas. Commonly called the Rio Grande Gold Tarantula as they are found in the Rio Grande Valley of Texas.

Description

Females 
Females live around 22 to 40 years. They own an orange to tan carapace with a slightly darker opisthosoma. The legs are mainly orange, beginning with an orange femur, with a black patella, followed by an orange tibia, while the tarsus and metatarsus are fully black.

Males 
Males live around 7 years, owning a dark brown carapace, with a black opisthosoma covered by dark orange hairs. While the legs are completely black.

Behavior 
They are known for their docile nature; if frightened they may fling hairs or run away, though this is rare. In very unique cases this spider may bite, though the venom is mild. While slings are more prone to burrowing, adults will usually find a hide instead of burrowing. Adults will usually stay out of their hides in an open area.

References

moderatum
Spiders described in 1939
Endemic fauna of Texas
Spiders of the United States